Matthew Cox (born 6 March 1988) is an English rugby union for Worcester Warriors in the Aviva Premiership.  He plays as a flanker but can also play as a number eight and lock. He has represented England at many levels and also played for the Sevens side. He previously played for Gloucester.

On 7 June 2021, Cox announces his retirement from professional rugby at the end of the 2020–21 season.

External links
Worcester Warriors profile
England profile

References

1988 births
Living people
Worcester Warriors players